The Miss Perú 1966 pageant was held on July 4, 1966. That year, 16 candidates competed for the two national crowns. The winners represented Peru at the Miss Universe and Miss International pageants. The other finalists entered different pageants.

Placements

Special awards

 Miss Photogenic - Arequipa - Madeline Hartog-Bel
 Miss Body - Tumbes - Enodia León
 Miss Elegance - Distrito Capital - Martha Quimper Suárez
 Miss Congeniality - Lambayeque - Rossi Martin
 Most Beautiful Face - Arequipa - Madeline Hartog-Bel

Delegates

Amazonas - Daniela Ojeda 
Áncash - Marilú Vásquez
Apurímac - Nelly Uriarte
Arequipa - Madeline Hartog-Bel
Cajamarca - Liliana San Miguel
Cuzco - Jimena Ramirez
Distrito Capital - Martha Quimper Suárez
Europe Perú - Elisa Trevant

Lambayeque - Rossi Martin
Loreto - Joselyn Parra
Moquegua - Rosa Gabriela Espinoza
Puno - Amparo Astete
San Martín - Luciana Vilchez
Tacna - Nelly Amiel 
Tumbes - Enodia León
USA Peru - Michelle Kovak

.

Contestant Notes 

Madeline Hartog-Bel competed in Miss Universe 1966 (where she placed in the Top 15), She was appointed to represent Peru the following year at Miss World 1967, where she won the crown.  She was one of the seven delegates from Peru who competed at both pageants, but the only one to make the top in Miss Universe and Miss World.

Martha Quimper Suárez was unable to represent Peru in Miss International 1966, due to its cancellation.  She did compete in Miss International 1967 where she reached the 3rd Runner-up position, making hers the highest placement for a Peruvian in this pageant.

References 

Miss Peru
1966 in Peru
1966 beauty pageants